"My Town" is a song by Canadian band Glass Tiger. Released in August 1991 as the fourth single from their third studio album, Simple Mission, Rod Stewart appears as a featured vocalist. Composition inspired by Celtic music, "My Town" was written by Glass Tiger bandmates Alan Frew, Alan Connelly and Wayne Parker, as well as Jim Cregan, who co-wrote two of Stewart's other hits. The song's lyrics are a tribute to Frew's hometown, Coatbridge, Scotland, and Stewart was invited to record the song with Glass Tiger because of his Scottish ancestry.

It became Glass Tiger's sixth top-10 hit in Canada, climbing to number eight on the RPM Top Singles chart in November of the same year and ending the year as Canada's 52nd-most-successful single. In the United Kingdom, due to Stewart's appearance, the single became the band's first song to chart since "Diamond Sun" in 1988, peaking at number 33 on the UK Singles Chart. Elsewhere, "My Town" managed to chart in Germany, where it peaked at number 51.

Background
"My Town" was written about Glass Tiger member Alan Frew's hometown of Coatbridge, Scotland. In an interview with Metal Express Radio, Frew said that he initially did not think to recruit Rod Stewart as a featured artist, despite spending time with him prior to the song's conception. The two men were having dinner one night when a person Stewart recognized asked Frew why he had not asked Stewart to sing on "My Town". Frew explained, "Rod asked me why he'd not been asked to sing on it and I'd said that I didn't want to play that card on him. He just said he wanted to sing on it, so he did and that's how he ended up singing on it."

Composition and lyrics
Celtic singing and instrumentation were the main influences on the composition on "My Town". Despite Glass Tiger being a Canadian band, the "Scotia" in the song's lyrics does not refer to the Canadian province of Nova Scotia, but rather Scotland, which was called Scotia during the Middle Ages. One of the lyrics states that "Burlington Bertie", a music hall song composed by Harry B. Norris in 1900, will be in Frew's heart forever.

Music video
The music video for the song, filmed in black-and-white, features numerous references to Scotland.  However, Rod Stewart does not appear in the video nor in the recording used for this video.

Track listings

7-inch single
A. "My Town" – 4:48
B. "The Tragedy of Love" – 4:31

UK CD single
 "My Town"
 "The Tragedy of Love"
 "Don't Forget Me (When I'm Gone)"
 "Diamond Sun"

UK 12-inch single
A1. "My Town"
B1. "The Tragedy of Love"
B2. "Don't Forget Me (When I'm Gone)"

Personnel
Personnel are taken from the UK CD single liner notes.

Glass Tiger
 Alan Frew – writing, vocals
 Alan Connelly – writing, guitars
 Sam Reid – keyboards
 Wayne Parker – writing, electric bass

Others
 Jim Cregan – writing, production
 Rod Stewart – vocals (uncredited)
 Tom Werman – production
 Ed Thacker – mixing

Charts

Weekly charts

Year-end charts

References

1990 songs
1991 singles
Black-and-white music videos
Capitol Records singles
Glass Tiger songs
Rod Stewart songs
Song recordings produced by Tom Werman
Songs about Scotland
Songs written by Alan Frew
Songs written by Jim Cregan